Zmijavci is a municipality in Croatia in the Split-Dalmatia County. It has a population of 2,048 (2011 census), 98% of which are Croats.

Sport
NK Croatia Zmijavci are the local football club.

References

Populated places in Split-Dalmatia County
Municipalities of Croatia